Jeremiah Haralson (April 1, 1846 – 1916?), was a politician from Alabama who served as a state legislator and was among the first ten African-American United States Congressmen. Born into slavery in Columbus, Georgia, Haralson became self-educated while enslaved in Selma, Alabama. He was a leader among freedmen after the American Civil War.

He became active in politics, being elected as a Republican to the State House and the State Senate from Dallas County, Alabama. He was elected and served in the United States House of Representatives, representing Alabama's 1st congressional district in the 44th United States Congress.

The conservative Democrats gained control of the state legislature and gerrymandered several districts. In 1876 Haralson was forced to run from the changed Alabama's 4th congressional district, the only one still having a majority-black population. Running as an independent against the Republican candidate, James T. Rapier, Haralson essentially split the Republican vote. Dallas County Sheriff Charles M. Shelley, a Democrat, won the seat with 38% of the vote.

Although not successful in gaining elective office again, Haralson was appointed to Republican patronage positions in the Customs Service, Department of Interior, and the Pension Bureau in Washington, DC. After 1884 he returned to the South. He was convicted of pension fraud in 1894, and seemingly vanishes from the historical record upon imprisonment in New York.

Early life and education
Born into slavery on the plantation of John Walker near Columbus, Georgia, Haralson was self-educated. He was sold on the auction block in Columbus to J.W. Thompson.

When Thompson died, Jeremiah was sold to Judge Jonathan Haralson of Selma, Alabama. This was the county seat of Dallas County, which had a majority-black population both before and after the Civil War. Jeremiah was enslaved until 1865. While a slave, he became a preacher.

Political career
After emancipation, Haralson taught himself to read and write and worked for a time as a farmer. He became involved in politics. In 1868 he campaigned for Democrat Horatio Seymour to defeat Republican Ulysses S. Grant for president. Some ex-Confederates questioned his sincerity, as most freedmen were supporting the Republican Party of Abraham Lincoln, who had gained their emancipation.

Some sources say that Haralson was a candidate for U.S. Congress in 1868. But the official results do not list him as a candidate. He would have been running from the Alabama First District, which reported 100% of votes for one candidate, so they may have conducted a primary in which he was defeated.

In 1870 Haralson allied with the Republican Party, but he maintained a network with some Democratic leaders. Republicans were suspicious of Haralson because of his friendships with Democrats such as Jefferson Davis, former president of the Confederacy; Rep. Lucius Q. C. Lamar of Mississippi, and Georgia Senator John B. Gordon, who was later elected as governor of that state.

In 1870 Haralson was elected as a Republican and the first black member of the Alabama House of Representatives. In 1872, he was elected to the State Senate from the Twenty-First District. He helped get a civil rights bill through the Senate during his term and was considered politically powerful.

He backed Republican Ulysses S. Grant for president in 1872. His pro-Grant stance brought him into disputes with P. B. S. Pinchback, the African-American governor of Louisiana, who served for thirty days following the suspension of the Republican governor there during impeachment proceedings because of a disputed gubernatorial election in that state in 1872.

In 1874, Haralson was elected as a Republican from Alabama's 1st congressional district, which then included both Selma and Mobile, to the Forty-fourth U.S. Congress (March 4, 1875 - March 3, 1877). His election was contested by Liberal Republican Frederick G. Bromberg. Haralson asked Judge Jonathan Haralson, his former master, to advocate his cause. The judge agreed and contacted his friends (former Confederates and current Democrats) serving in Congress. With the judge's advocacy, Haralson was accepted into the House of Representatives in March 1875. As a member of Congress, Haralson sought a general amnesty for former Confederates (who had been temporarily barred from office) in order to help create harmony between blacks and whites.

Haralson's oratorical abilities drew the commendation of Frederick Douglass, an established civil rights leader in the North. Douglass described Haralson as speaking “with humor enough in him to supply a half dozen circus clowns.”

In 1876 Haralson ran for reelection. Due to redistricting by the state legislature to accomplish gerrymandering, he was running for Alabama's 4th congressional district, which then had a black majority. Election campaigns in the 1870s had been violent as Democrats sought to regain political control of the state, using fraud, intimidation and physical violence to suppress the black vote, because of the black-majority or near-majority population in many counties, who were voting for Republican candidates.

Former congressman James T. Rapier, who was also African American, had bought a plantation in this district. This was the only remaining Alabama district in which the black population still comprised a majority population. Rapier won the Republican primary and thus the nomination, but Haralson ran as an independent. Their competition split the black Republican vote: Haralson received 33.93% of the vote, more than Rapier's 28%. But the Democratic candidate Charles M. Shelley, former Dallas County Sheriff, won the seat with 38% of the vote.

Haralson ran against Shelley again in 1878. He received 42.57% of the vote, or 6,545 votes, and was defeated again. This was considerably lower than the 8,675 he had received two years before, showing the effects of Democratic suppression of the black Republican vote. 
  
In 1879, Haralson was appointed by President Rutherford B. Hayes to a Federal patronage position in the United States customhouse in Baltimore, Maryland. He was later employed as a clerk at the Department of the Interior. Appointed on August 12, 1882, to the Pension Bureau in Washington, D.C.; he served until August 21, 1884.

Haralson moved to Louisiana, where he engaged in agricultural pursuits. He moved to Arkansas in 1894, where he served as pension agent for a short time. He was indicted and convicted on charges of pension fraud in 1895, and vanishes from historical record upon entering the Albany County Penitentiary in Albany, New York.

Personal life
In 1870, Jeremiah Haralson married Ellen Norwood; they had a son, Henry, born in 1871. In 1885, Booker T. Washington proudly announced that Henry was a student at Tuskegee Institute, where Washington was president.

Later life and death
Anecdotal evidence compiled in the Biographical Directory of the United States Congress reported that he moved to Texas, then Oklahoma and Colorado, worked as a coal miner and was killed by wild animals while hunting near Denver . However, no corroborating evidence has been found for either his Western travels or his unusual death, leaving his fate an unsolved mystery.

See also
List of African-American United States representatives
List of people who disappeared

References

Further reading

Bailey, Richard. They Too Call Alabama Home: African American Profiles, 1800-1999. Montgomery: Pyramid Publishing, 1999.
Clay, William L. Just Permanent Interests: Black Americans in Congress, 1870-1991. New York: Amistad Press, 1992.
Foner, Eric. Freedom's Lawmakers: A Directory of Black Officeholders during Reconstruction. Baton Rouge: Louisiana State University Press, 1996.
 Lyman, Brian. (February 26, 2020) "The Lost Congressman: What happened to Jeremiah Haralson?" Montgomery: Montgomery Advertiser

Historical novel
McGee, Val. Selma, AuthorHouse, 2008

1846 births
1890s missing person cases
1916 deaths
19th-century American politicians
19th-century American slaves
20th-century African-American people
African-American members of the United States House of Representatives
African-American politicians during the Reconstruction Era
African-American state legislators in Alabama
Alabama state senators
Deaths due to animal attacks in the United States
Louisiana Republicans
Members of the Alabama House of Representatives
Missing person cases in New York (state)
People from Columbus, Georgia
Politicians from Selma, Alabama
Republican Party members of the United States House of Representatives from Alabama